Pouembout  is a commune in the North Province of New Caledonia, an overseas territory of France in the Pacific Ocean.

Geography

Climate
Pouembout has a tropical savanna climate (Köppen climate classification Aw).

References

Communes of New Caledonia